The Providence Friars men's ice hockey team is a National Collegiate Athletic Association (NCAA) Division I college ice hockey program that represents Providence College. The Friars are a member of Hockey East. The skating Friars are currently coached by Nate Leaman has been the head coach of the skating Friars since 2011, leading them to a national championship in 2015. They play at the 3,030-seat Schneider Arena in Providence, Rhode Island.

Season-by-season results
Source:

Early years
Providence began their ice hockey program in 1927 with a 6–4 win over Springfield. Unfortunately it would be over 25 years before the Friars could get their next win. The inaugural season ended with seven straight losses, utilizing three coaches in total, and due to a lack of available ice the program was shuttered until 1952. When Providence did return to the ice they did so in the Rhode Island Auditorium, and with Providence native Dick Rondeau behind the bench. The results were poor at the start, understandably, but Rondeau did get the Friars to produce a winning season in his third year, coincidentally the same year the Friars played in their first conference, the NEHL.

Rondeau left after 1956 and turned the team over to Tom Eccleston who continued to build the Friar's resume. In 8 seasons Eccleston only had one losing season and when ECAC Hockey was formed in 1961 he had the team well-positioned. Despite a 14th-place finish (out of 28) Providence was selected as one of the 8 teams to participate in the first conference tournament. The Friars shot up the standings the following year, finishing 5th before winning their first conference title in 1964 which they followed up with the Conference Championship. The win sent Providence to the National Tournament for the first time but the Friars lost both games to finish a disappointing 4th.

Lamoriello Years
Eccleston retired from coaching in 1964 and turned the team over to former NHLer Zellio Toppazzini but, after a good first season, the Friars plummeted to the bottom of the conference and remained their for three years before former Friar all-star Lou Lamoriello was installed as head coach. The team began to recover in Lamoriello's second season and made the conference tournament the following year. After a few seasons oscillating up and down the standings Lamoriello recruited Ron Wilson to Providence and the defenseman paid immediate dividends. Wilson won the ECAC Hockey Rookie of the Year in 1974 and then exploded for 87 points in just 27 games during his sophomore season. Wilson led the entire conference in scoring and finished second in the nation and set an all-time NCAA record for assists (61) and points (87) by a defenseman both overall and per game. While the overall totals have both been surpassed, Wilson still has the records for assists and points per game for a defenseman (as of 2019). Wilson was named the ECAC Hockey Player of the Year but without much help (as evidenced by his contributing on 72.5% of Providence's goals that season) Wilson couldn't get the Friars past the conference quarterfinals in any of his 4 seasons.

After Wilson graduated in 1977, Lamoriello was able to keep the team in the conference playoffs and win their first postseason game since Eccleston and then upset 26–1 Boston University in the semifinal to guarantee the Friars a trip to the 1978 NCAA Tournament. When Boston College won the ECAC Championship Providence was given the second eastern seed, however, because BU had such a stellar season the NCAA selection committee gave them an at-large bid. Providence was forced to play the nation's top team a second time to earn a berth in the national semifinal and, with the Terriers looking for revenge, Providence couldn't pull off the upset a second time. Despite the setback success stayed with the Friars and PC made the conference tournament each of the following six seasons. Lamoriello got the team to post its first 20-win season in 1979–80 and followed that up with a surprising tournament championship. Unfortunately the Friars still could not win a tournament game and were swept out by Michigan State in the quarterfinals. After a second 20-win season Lamoriello was promoted to Athletic director in 1982 but remained as coach for another season while he found a suitable replacement. In his final season the Friars demolished the previous program by posting 33 wins, albeit with 9 games more than they had ever played, and finished atop the conference for the second time. Lamoriello's team finished as the conference tournament runner-up and made the NCAA tournament where they finally managed to win a game, sweeping Minnesota–Duluth out of the quarterfinals. Providence was stymied by Wisconsin in the semifinal but the team redeemed itself with a 3rd-place finish.

Hockey East
Steve Stirling was introduced as the new coach the following year and kept on rolling with another 20+ win season. In 1984 all 6 teams in the East Division and Lowell left the conference and formed Hockey East. While Providence was mostly a middling team that season, when the playoffs came around, junior goaltender Chris Terreri came into his own. After allowing 2 goals in the two quarterfinal games against Northeastern, Terreri shut down Boston University in the semifinal and led the Friars against Hockey East champion Boston College in the championship. Terreri held one of the nation's top offensive teams to a single goal in his 65-save masterpiece as Providence won in double overtime. Allowing just 5 goals in four and a half games was an astounding effort, especially at a time when most teams were routinely scoring 4 goals per game.

Terreri continued his MVP performance in the NCAA Tournament when the Friars were pitted against Michigan State. The Spartans were the best team all season and entered the tournament having just tied the record for the most wins in a season. In the first game, despite the Spartans potent offense, they only managed to win the game by a single goal, leaving the door open for the Friars in the rematch. Terreri held Michigan State to 2 goals, making 83 saves in the two games, and allowing the 4 his team scored to earn them a trip into the semifinals as one of the biggest upsets in tournament history. In the semifinal Providence met Boston College once more and the two teams battled in a lopsided game. While Terreri was bombarded by shots, BC's Scott Gordon had a much easier time but the teams remained tied after regulation. This time it took three overtime periods and with the Terreri setting an NCAA record for saves in a Frozen Four game (stall a record as of 2019) the Friars won the game and made their first championship appearance. Terreri was again stellar in the final game against Rensselaer, allowing 2 goals on 42 shots, but this time his team couldn't support him offensively and the Friars lost 1–2. Despite the loss, the astounding performance by Terreri (2.14 GAA, .949 sv%) earned him Tournament MOP honors, the only losing player to win the award since 1960.

Middling Results

After the spectacular finish the team suffered a blow when Stirling resigned to return to Division III Babson and he was replaced by Mike McShane. McShane's tenure was neither good nor bad for the Friars as the team finished with a ~.500 record in his nine seasons but early on Providence lost their leading figure when Lou Lamoriello became the team president for the New Jersey Devils. The Friars continued on with McShane leading them to four consecutive 20+ win seasons in the early 1990s but he was eventually replaced by Paul Pooley in 1994. Early on Pooley looked to be the man to lead the Friars, guiding the team to its second Hockey East tournament title in 1996 but the results soon turned and his tenure with Providence ended with 4 straight conference quarterfinal losses.

After Pooley Providence brought back a name from its past, hoping that Tim Army would be able to succeed as Lamoriello one had, but in six seasons Army produced just one winning campaign (his first) and Providence missed out on the playoffs entirely in his final three years.

Return to Prominence
In 2011 former Union bench boss Nate Leaman was brought in and the team responded by winning its first playoff round in over a decade. By year two the team had a winning record and in the third season Leaman had led Providence to its first 20+ win year since 2001. In 2015, led by junior goaltender Jon Gillies, Providence won 26 games (the most since 1983) and finished tied for second in Hockey East. Despite this the team was upset in the quarterfinals by New Hampshire and had to wait to see if they could get in on the strength of their record. The Friars did manage to secure of the last at-large berths and opened  the tournament against 4th overall seeded Miami. Providence posted an enormous 4-goal second period in their backyard to build a 6–2 lead but the RedHawks came storming back with three extra-attacker goals late in the third. Brandon Tanev ended the comeback bid with an empty-netter to advance Providence to the Regional Final. After the first game jitters Gillies appeared to find his game and limited Denver and Omaha to a single goal each in the next two contests to lead Providence back to the National Championship game. 30 years after their first title tilt it appears that Providence would again lose out but after BU netminder Matt O'Connor dropped the puck into his own net to tie the game the momentum swing in the Friars' direction allowing Tanev to score the game-winning goal just over two minutes later.

Leaman continues to lead the Friars and had led the program to six consecutive tournament berths winning at least one game in four of those years. Leaman currently sits 3rd all-time in program wins and is #1 in winning percentage (as of 2019).

Season-by-season results

Source:

Records vs. current Hockey East teams
As of the completion of 2018–19 season

All-time coaching records
As of completion of 2021–22 season

† Providence had 3 people serve as head coach during their first season

Statistical leaders
Source:

Career points leaders

Career goaltending leaders

GP = Games played; Min = Minutes played; W = Wins; L = Losses; T = Ties; GA = Goals against; SO = Shutouts; SV% = Save percentage; GAA = Goals against average

Minimum 35 of team's games

Statistics current through the start of the 2020–21 season.

Current roster
As of August 22, 2022.

|}

Awards and honors

Hockey Hall of Fame
Source:

Lou Lamoriello (2009)

United States Hockey Hall of Fame
Source:

Dick Rondeau (1985)
Lou Lamoriello (2014)
Ron Wilson (2017)

NCAA

Individual awards

Spencer Penrose Award
Tom Eccleston: 1964

NCAA Division I Ice Hockey Scoring Champion
Jack Dugan: 2020

Tim Taylor Award
Jon Gillies: 2013

Derek Hines Unsung Hero Award
Kyle Murphy: 2013

Tournament Most Outstanding Player
Chris Terreri: 1985
Jon Gillies: 2015

All-American teams
AHCA First Team All-Americans

1963–64: Larry Kish, D
1964–65: Grant Heffernan, F
1974–75: Ron Wilson, D
1975–76: Ron Wilson, D
1982–83: Randy Velischek, D; Kurt Kleinendorst, F
1984–85: Chris Terreri, G; Tim Army, F
2015–16: Jake Walman, D
2019–20: Jack Dugan, F

AHCA Second Team All-Americans

1983–84: Peter Taglianetti, D; Gaetano Orlando, F
1984–85: Peter Taglianetti, D
1985–86: Chris Terreri, G
1987–88: Gord Cruickshank, F
1988–89: Rick Bennett, F
1991–92: Rob Gaudreau, F
1993–94: Chad Quenneville, F
1994–95: Chad Quenneville, F
2000–01: Nolan Schaefer, G; Devin Rask, F
2003–04: Stephen Wood, F
2012–13: Jon Gillies, G
2014–15: Jon Gillies, G
2015–16: Mark Jankowski, F
2016–17: Jake Walman, F
2017–18: Jacob Bryson, F
2018–19: Josh Wilkins, F

ECAC Hockey

Individual awards

Player of the Year
Ron Wilson: 1975
Randy Velischek: 1983

Rookie of the Year
Ron Wilson: 1974

Most Outstanding Player in Tournament
Kurt Kleinendorst: 1981

All-Conference teams
First Team All-ECAC Hockey

1962–63: Larry Kish, D
1963–64: Larry Kish, D; Grant Heffernan, F; Ray Mooney, F
1964–65: Grant Heffernan, F
1974–75: Ron Wilson, D
1975–76: Ron Wilson, D
1981–82: Scot Kleinendorst, D
1982–83: Randy Velischek, D; Kurt Kleinendorst, F
1983–84: Gaetano Orlando, F

Second Team All-ECAC Hockey

1961–62: Joe McGeough, D; Marsh Tschida, F
1962–63: Lou Lamoriello, F
1963–64: John Keough, F
1976–77: Ron Wilson, D
1978–79: Jim Korn, D; Colin Ahern, F
1979–80: Scot Kleinendorst, D; Steve O'Neill, F
1981–82: Randy Velischek, D; Kurt Kleinendorst, F
1982–83: Paul Guay, F
1983–84: Peter Taglianetti, D

Hockey East

Individual awards

Player of the Year
Chris Terreri: 1985

Best Defensive Defenseman
Vincent Desharnais: 2019

Goaltending Champions
Chris Terreri: 1985
Jon Gillies: 2015

Coach of the Year
Paul Pooley: 2001
Nate Leaman: 2016

Best Defensive Forward
Travis Dillabough: 1997
Tim Schaller: 2013
Ross Mauermann: 2014
Noel Acciari: 2015
Brian Pinho: 2018

Len Ceglarski Award
Jon DiSalvatore: 2002
Ross Mauermann: 2014
Jacob Bryson: 2018, 2019

Rookie of the Year
Rob Gaudreau: 1989
Craig Darby: 1992
Jon Gillies: 2013

Tournament Most Valuable Player
Chris Terreri: 1985
Bob Bell: 1995
Joe Hulbig: 1996

All-Conference teams
First Team

1984–85: Chris Terreri, G; Peter Taglianetti, D; Tim Army, F
1988–89: Jim Hughes, D
1989–90: Mike Boback, F
1991–92: Rob Gaudreau, D; Mike Boback, F
1994–95: Chad Quenneville, F
1995–96: Dan Dennis, D
2000–01: Devin Rask, F
2003–04: Stephen Wood, D
2012–13: Jon Gillies, G
2014–15: Jon Gillies, G
2015–16: Jake Walman, D; Mark Jankowski, F
2016–17: Jake Walman, F
2017–18: Jacob Bryson, D; Erik Foley, F
2018–19: Josh Wilkins, F

Second Team

1985–86: Gord Cruickshank, F
1986–87: Gord Cruickshank, F
1989–90: Jeff Serowik, D; Rick Bennett, F
1990–91: Rob Gaudreau, F
1992–93: Chris Therien, D
1998–99: Mike Omicioli, D
2000–01: Nolan Schaefer, G; Matt Libby, D
2002–03: Stephen Wood, D
2007–08: Matt Taormina, D
2017–18: Hayden Hawkey, G
2018–19: Jacob Bryson, D

Third Team

2017–18: Brian Pinho, F
2018–19: Brandon Duhaime, F
2021–22: Max Crozier, D; Brett Berard, F

Rookie Team

1984–85: Shawn Whitham, D; Paul Cavallini, D
1986–87: Matt Merten, G; Rick Bennett, F
1988–89: Shaun Kane, D; Rob Gaudreau, F
1990–91: Chris Therien, D
1991–92: Craig Darby, F
1997–98: Boyd Ballard, G
1999–00: Peter Fregoe, F
2000–01: Regan Kelly, D
2003–04: Colin McDonald, F
2005–06: Cody Wild, D
2006–07: Mark Fayne, D
2011–12: Ross Mauermann, F
2012–13: Jon Gillies, G
2018–19: Jack Dugan, F

Olympians
This is a list of Providence alumni were a part of an Olympic team.

Providence Friars Hall of Fame
The following is a list of people associated with the Providence men's ice hockey program who were elected into the Providence College Athletic Hall of Fame.

Tim Army
J. Robert Bellemore
Mike Boback
Brian Burke
Edward Conaty
Tom Eccleston
Rob Gaudreau
Grant Heffernan
Dan Kennedy
Larry Kish
Kurt Kleinendorst
Lou Lamoriello
John Marchetti
Ed Monahan
Gaetano Orlando
Richard Pumple
Chad Quenneville
Robert Reall
Herman Schneider
Peter Taglianetti
Chris Terreri
Marshall Tschida
Randy Velischek
Brad Wilson
Randy Wilson
Ron Wilson

Friars in the NHL
As of July 1, 2022

Source:

See also
Providence Friars women's ice hockey
Providence Friars

References

External links
Providence Friars men's ice hockey

 
Ice hockey teams in Rhode Island